The 1948 Segunda División Peruana, the second division of Peruvian football (soccer), was played by 8 teams. The tournament winners, Jorge Chávez (C) and Ciclista Lima were promoted to the Primera División Peruana 1950.

Results

Standings

External links
 La Historia de la Segunda 1949

 

Peruvian Segunda División seasons
Peru2
2